Lainate is a comune (municipality) in the Metropolitan City of Milan in the Italian region Lombardy, located about  northwest of Milan.

Lainate borders the following municipalities: Caronno Pertusella, Origgio, Garbagnate Milanese, Nerviano, Arese, Rho, Pogliano Milanese.

Lainate is home to Villa Visconti Borromeo Arese Litta, a Medici-inspired 1500s villa that today attracts many tourists because of its nymphaeum, and the headquarters of the confectionery company Perfetti Van Melle which sells candies and gums all over the world

It is also popular for Villoresi Canal and its forest where people usually go for a walk/run.

References

External links
 www.comune.lainate.mi.it

Cities and towns in Lombardy